Senator Nieves may refer to:

Brian Nieves (born 1965), Missouri State Senate
Ramón Luis Nieves (born 1975), Senate of Puerto Rico